Wi Jong-sim  (born 13 October 1997,) is a North Korean footballer who plays as a forward for the North Korea women's national football team and North Korea women's national under-20 football team. She was part of the team at the 2014 Asian Games and 2015 EAFF Women's East Asian Cup. At the club level, she played for Kalmaegi in North Korea.

International goals

Under 17

National team

References

External links
 

1997 births
Living people
North Korean women's footballers
North Korea women's international footballers
Place of birth missing (living people)
Women's association football forwards
Footballers at the 2014 Asian Games
Asian Games gold medalists for North Korea
Asian Games medalists in football
Footballers at the 2018 Asian Games
Medalists at the 2014 Asian Games
Universiade medalists in football
Universiade gold medalists for North Korea
Medalists at the 2019 Summer Universiade